NTT Publishing Co., Ltd. (エヌ・ティ・ティ出版株式会社 Enu Ti Ti Shuppan Kabushiki gaisha) is a Japanese publishing and record label company, which is an affiliate company of NTT.

The company has published many albums, including:
 Final Fantasy VI Grand Finale
 Piano Collections: Final Fantasy VI
 Final Fantasy IV Celtic Moon
 Final Fantasy: Pray
 Final Fantasy VI Original Sound Version
 Final Fantasy VI Special Tracks
 Final Fantasy 1987-1994
 F. F. Mix
 Final Fantasy: Love Will Grow
 Symphonic Suite Final Fantasy
 Final Fantasy III: Yūkyū no Kaze Densetsu
 Final Fantasy V Dear Friends
 Project Majestic Mix: A Tribute to Nobuo Uematsu
 Phantasmagoria - Nobuo Uematsu
 Chrono Trigger Original Sound Version

They are also the producers of:
 Final Fantasy: Legend of the Crystals

See also
 List of record labels

External links
 NTT Publishing

Ntt Publishing Co
Ntt Publishing Co
Nippon Telegraph and Telephone
Mass media companies based in Tokyo
Japanese companies established in 1987